"Dum Dum" is a song written by Jackie DeShannon and Sharon Sheeley and performed by Brenda Lee.  The song reached #4 on the Billboard Hot 100, #4 in Australia, and #22 in the UK in 1961.  It was featured on her 1961 album, All the Way.

The song was produced by Owen Bradley.  The singles B-side, "Eventually", reached #56 on the Billboard Hot 100.

The song was ranked #91 on Billboard magazine's Top Hot 100 songs of 1961.

References

1961 songs
1961 singles
Songs written by Jackie DeShannon
Songs written by Sharon Sheeley
Brenda Lee songs
Song recordings produced by Owen Bradley
Decca Records singles